Jarota may refer to:

People
 Filip Jarota (born 2001), Polish squash player
 Jan Jarota (born 1953), Polish politician

Other
 Jarota Jarocin, Polish football club